The Centrum LIM skyscraper was built in 1989 in the center of Warsaw, Poland, by LIM Joint Venture Sp. Ltd., a consortium of three partners: LOT (Polish Airlines), ILBAU GmbH (an Austrian construction company), and the hotel chain Marriott International. In 1998, ILBAU sold its share to SGS GmbH.

The locals usually call the facility "the Marriott". The building quickly gained prestige and popularity, in part by being among the first five-star hotels in Poland.

The designers were Jerzy Skrzypczak, Andrzej Bielobradek, and Krzysztof Stefanski. The facade is a dark green color, and is adjacent to the Oxford Tower. The building has white edges (illuminated at night with bright, white light) as well as two floors that form dark horizontal stripes, one halfway up the structure and the other at the top, that serve as utility areas.

A shopping center known as Gallery LIM is on the two lower floors. It includes about 40 shops, cafes and restaurants, and the LOT ticket office. Rental office space is in the lower part of the tower (between floors 5 and 19). The Warsaw Marriott Hotel is located on floors 20 and above, and has 518 rooms and 95 suites. The top floor is a presidential suite. Each room has air conditioning and satellite links. Warsaw Marriott Hotel guests have at their disposal a sauna, swimming pool, conference facilities, restaurants, and two bars. Without its 30-meter antenna on the roof, the building is 140 meters tall. The building also houses a casino.

The building is connected by subway to Warszawa Centralna railway station.

There is a proposal for a 71-storey tower, Lilium, to be built on the site currently occupied by the lower western wing of the building.

Trivia 
 In the top two floors of the center is a cafe LIM Panorama Club with one of the highest publicly accessible views of the entire city of Warsaw.
 In 1999, the famous French climber Alain Robert climbed the Marriott Hotel without protection or permission. In the same year, the same feat was completed by Polish photographer and climber Dawid Kaszlikowski, while 10 years later, on 22 April 2009, the building was scaled by Bartholomew Opiela. On 2 June 2019 Marcin Banot climbed the Marriott Hotel.
 The name LIM actually came from the first letter of the name of every member of the venture. L is for LOT, I is for ILBAU, and M is for Marriott.
 Between 1994 and 1996 in the basement of the hotel was situated Maloka BBS, the first commercial ISP maintained by Stanisław Tymiński, an applicant for RP President

See also
 List of tallest buildings in Poland

References
 Skyscraper Page
 Detailed articles in cosmopolis.ch about the Warsaw Marriott
 Interesting Facts about Centrum LIM

Buildings and structures completed in 1989
Skyscrapers in Warsaw
Hotels in Warsaw
Śródmieście, Warsaw
Skyscraper office buildings in Warsaw
Skyscraper hotels in Poland